Krøyer or Kroyer is a surname and can refer to:

Henrik Nikolai Krøyer (1799–1870),  Danish zoologist
Peder Severin Krøyer (1851–1909), Norwegian-Danish painter
Marie Triepcke Krøyer Alfvén (1867–1940), commonly known as Marie Krøyer, Danish painter 
Hans Ernst Krøyer (1798–1879), Danish composer
Bill Kroyer, American animator and director

See also

Krøyer's deep sea angler fish